Abdisho, ʾAbdisho, Abdishu, ʿAbd Īshūʿ, or Odisho, meaning “servant of Christ” in Syriac, is a Syriac Christian name that may refer to:

 Odisho

 Abdisho (died 345) (298–345), deacon and martyr of the Church of the East
 a companion in martyrdom to Desan (bishop)
 a martyr at Arbela in 376 with Acepsimas of Hnaita
 Abda and Abdisho, two Christian bishops who were martyred on May 16, in either 376
 Abdishu ibn Bahriz , nestorian translator
 Abdisho I, Patriarch of the Church of the East from 963 to 986
 Abdisho III, Patriarch of the Church of the East from 1139 to 1148
 Abdisho bar Berika (Ebed-Jesu) (d.1318), author of medieval catalogue of ancient Greek and Syriac writers
 Abdisho IV Maron, second Patriarch of the Chaldean Catholic Church, from 1555 to 1570
 Abdisho V Khayat, or Mar Audishu V Khayyath (1827–1899), patriarch of the Chaldean Catholic Church from 1894 to 1899

Arabic masculine given names
Syriac masculine given names